The 134th IOC Session was the IOC Session which was held in Lausanne, Switzerland on 24 June 2019.

Bidders
Milan, Italy was the sole bidder to host the 134th IOC Session and was elected in a unanimous vote at the 131st IOC Session in Lima in September 2017. However, in 2018 there was a late Italian bid to host the 2026 Winter Olympics in Milan and Cortina d'Ampezzo (which hosted the 1956 Winter Olympics). The Olympic Charter does not allow a session to take place in a country that has a candidate for the Olympic Games awarded at the session. Consequently, the IOC session was moved to the SwissTech Convention Center in Lausanne.

2026 Winter Olympics host city election

The host city of the 2026 Winter Olympics was elected at the 134th IOC Session. Bids were submitted to the IOC in 2018.

Votes results

New IOC headquarters inauguration
The International Olympic Committee (IOC) officially inaugurated its new headquarters in Lausanne, Switzerland on 23 June during the celebration of Olympic Day. In 2019 this symbolic day marks the 125th anniversary of the creation of the IOC.

Election of new IOC members
Ten new IOC members were elected at the session. The new members are:
  Odette Assembe-Engoulou – Cameroon
  Filomena Fortes – President of Cape Verde Olympic Committee
  Matlohang Moiloa-Ramoqopo – President of Lesotho National Olympic Committee
  Tidjane Thiam – Ivory Coast
  Laura Chinchilla – Costa Rica
  Erick Thohir – President of Indonesian Olympic Committee
  Spyros Capralos – President of Greek Olympic Committee
  Mustapha Berraf – President of Algerian Olympic Committee and Association of National Olympic Committees of Africa
  Narinder Dhruv Batra – President of Indian Olympic Association
  Kee Heung Lee – President of Korean Sport & Olympic Committee

References

International Olympic Committee sessions
2019 in Swiss sport
Sport in Lausanne
2026 Winter Olympics bids
2019 conferences
Events in Lausanne
21st century in Lausanne
June 2019 sports events in Switzerland